Resurgence & Ecologist is a British bi-monthly magazine covering environmental issues, engaged activism, philosophy, arts and ethical living. In 1973 – and for the next 43 years – the Editor-in-Chief was former Jain monk and author Satish Kumar. Kumar stepped aside from his editing role to become Editor Emeritus on his 80th birthday in 2016. The current editor is Marianne Brown. The magazine combines the former Resurgence magazine, edited by Kumar, with The Ecologist, which in recent years has been published online only.

Resurgence & Ecologist is published by the Resurgence Trust, an educational charity registered in England and Wales and based at The Resurgence Centre, Hartland, Bideford, Devon.

History 
Resurgence was founded in 1966 by John Papworth. Described as the artistic and spiritual voice of the green movement in Great Britain, contributors to Resurgence have included E.F. Schumacher, E. P. Thompson, Ivan Illich, R. D. Laing, Martin Ryle, Theodore Roszak, Fritjof Capra, Wendell Berry, Vandana Shiva, James Lovelock, Antony Gormley and the Dalai Lama.

In September 2012, Resurgence merged with The Ecologist, resulting in the new, jointly named publication.

See also

Environmental direct action in the United Kingdom
Environmental inequality in the United Kingdom
Environmental issues in the United Kingdom
Schumacher College

References

External links
 Resurgence & Ecologist home page

1966 establishments in the United Kingdom
2012 disestablishments in the United Kingdom
Bi-monthly magazines published in the United Kingdom
Defunct magazines published in the United Kingdom
Environmental magazines
Environmental websites
Environmentalism in the United Kingdom
Magazines established in 1966
Magazines disestablished in 2012
Magazines published in the United Kingdom